The  is a river in Japan which flows through Gifu Prefecture. It is part of the Kiso River system.

Geography
The river originates from Mount Yaki on the border of Nakatsugawa and Ena and flows west. It flows through the Akigawa Dam and the Ōi Dam before emptying into the Kiso River.

History
Ōi-juku, a post town on the historical Nakasendō, was on the banks of the Agi River.

River communities
The Agi river flows through the cities of Ena and Nakatsugawa in Gifu Prefecture.

References

Rivers of Gifu Prefecture
Rivers of Japan